Prince Gustav Franz Maria of Thurn and Taxis, (22 August 1888 – 30 April 1919) was a member of the House of Thurn and Taxis and a Prince of Thurn and Taxis by birth. As a member of the Thule Society, Gustav was killed by the Bavarian Soviet Republic government during the German Revolution of 1918–19.

Family
Gustav was born in Dresden, Kingdom of Saxony as the fourth child and second son of Prince Franz of Thurn and Taxis and his wife Countess Theresia Grimaud of Orsay. Through his father, Gustav was a grandson of Maximilian Karl, 6th Prince of Thurn and Taxis and his wife Princess Mathilde Sophie of Oettingen-Oettingen and Oettingen-Spielberg.

Life
Gustav studied philosophy at the University of Tübingen. After fighting in World War I, he became a member of the Thule Society, a German occultist and völkisch group in Munich, named after a mythical northern country from Greek legend.

German Revolution
As White Guard forces (a coalition of Prussian and Bavarian troops combined with Freikorps) surrounded Munich, the Communists began to raid nationalist strong points throughout the city. On 26 April 1919, the Red Army broke into the Thule Society premises and arrested secretary Countess Heila von Westarp, Gustav, and five other members, labelling them as "right-wing spies." Gustav and the other hostages were taken to the cellar of the Luitpold Gymnasium, which had served as a Red Army post since mid-April. The seven Thule Society members, including Gustav, and three Freikorps soldiers were killed on 30 April as a reprisal for reports of the killing of Red soldiers by Whites at Starnberg. Gustav and his fellow hostages were lined up against a wall and executed by a firing squad. Their deaths may have also been a reprisal for an attempt by Thule Society members to infiltrate the Bavarian Soviet Republic's government and stage a coup d'état on 30 April. Gustav was the most notable of the four titled members killed in the incident, due to his family's extensive ties with several of Europe's royal houses.

Ancestry

Notes

References

1888 births
1919 deaths
Nobility from Dresden
Princes of Thurn und Taxis
German Roman Catholics
German Army personnel of World War I
Thule Society members
Bavarian Soviet Republic
Murdered royalty
People executed by Germany by firing squad
Executed people from Saxony